Charly Arnolt (born July 14, 1987) is an American sports broadcaster and television personality for ESPN. She is best known for her tenure as a sportscaster and ring announcer with WWE from 2016 to 2021, where she appeared under the ring name Charly Caruso. She is currently a backup host and moderator on ESPN's First Take with Stephen A. Smith and Molly Qerim.

Early life and education 
Arnolt was born  in Indianapolis, Indiana. She is Italian American. Arnolt developed a love for sports as a child, and began playing softball, volleyball, and gymnastics. She had hopes of going to the Olympics as a gymnast, but retired from the sport due to injuries. She also had aspirations of playing volleyball at a collegiate level, but was hindered because of her height.

In 2010, Arnolt graduated summa cum laude from American University with a degree in broadcast journalism. She previously attended North Central High School.

Career

Early journalism career 
In 2010, she joined WSAZ-TV as a reporter in Huntington, West Virginia. Arnolt later moved back to Indianapolis to work as a freelance reporter for WXIN "Fox 59".  In 2011, she moved to WDAF-TV "Fox 4" in Kansas City, Missouri. where she worked for about two years. In 2014, she returned to WXIN where she became a sports reporter and anchor.

WWE (2016–2021) 
Arnolt was invited by friend, NFL Jacksonville Jaguars and future All Elite Wrestling co-owner Tony Khan to a WWE SmackDown show in Indianapolis in 2016. At that show, Arnolt met WWE Senior Director of Talent Relations Mark Carrano, who connected her with WWE Monday Night Raw play-by-play commentator Michael Cole who is instrumental in hiring TV broadcasters and ring announcers for the company. Cole was very interested, but there were no openings. When Brandi Rhodes opted to leave WWE in May 2016, a door opened, and Arnolt joined WWE. She adopted the name Charly Caruso and debuted as a ring announcer for WWE NXT in 2016, but it didn't take long for her to make the main roster, interviewing WWE superstars and hosting events, segments and shows, whether on USA Network, WWE YouTube, WWE social media or WWE Network. She hosted pre-show panels and conducted backstage interviews on Monday Night RAW and WWE NXT until 2021, when she did not re-sign a new contract with WWE.

ESPN 
Charly joined ESPN in September 2018. She does updates on SportsCenter and hosts SportsCenter show on Snapchat. A couple months later, she hosted First Take for the first time after someone in the talent department asked her what she wanted to do at the network if she had her choice. After she made a favorable impression in late December 2018 she received more opportunities to First Take and cemented her role as the primary fill in host.

Arnolt is also part of the First Take, Her Take podcast on ESPN.  The weekly show, which also features Kimberley Martin and Elle Duncan, has the same format as the television show. The podcast allows all three of them to discuss other topics about their lives and culture.

Arnolt additionally also regularly appears on SportsNation on ESPN+ as well as other shows on the streaming service, although she acknowledged that over the past 12 to 18 months it has been difficult to make sure there was no conflict between her WWE and ESPN schedules. She has since completed her move from the WWE to ESPN.

Arnolt debuted as a fight interviewer at UFC on ESPN: dos Anjos vs. Fiziev on July 9, 2022.

References 

American people of Italian descent
American reporters and correspondents
American sports journalists
ESPN people
People from Indianapolis
Professional wrestling announcers
Living people
1987 births